Nea Ionia Municipal Indoor Athletic Center (Greek: Δημοτικό Κλειστό Γυμναστήριο Νέας Ιωνίας), is an indoor sporting arena that is located in Volos, Greece. The arena is mainly used to host basketball and volleyball games. The seating capacity of the arena is 1,964 people.

History
Nea Ionia Municipal Indoor Athletic Center hosted the 2004 HEBA Greek All-Star Game. It also hosted the 2015 FIBA Under-18 European Championship, and the 2019 FIBA Under-18 European Championship. The arena hosts the home games of the Greek basketball  club Niki Volou.

References

External links
Image 1 of Nea Ionia Municipal Indoor Athletic Center Interior
Image 2 of Nea Ionia Municipal Indoor Athletic Center Interior
ΔΗΜΟΤΙΚΟ ΚΛΕΙΣΤΟ ΓΥΜΝΑΣΤΗΡΙΟ ΝΕΑΣ ΙΩΝΙΑΣ 

Basketball venues in Greece
Indoor arenas in Greece
Volleyball venues in Greece